Sclerophrys pentoni is a species of toad in the family Bufonidae found in western and central Africa. Its natural habitats are dry savanna, subtropical or tropical dry shrubland, subtropical or tropical dry lowland grassland, rivers, intermittent freshwater marshes, and hot deserts. It is threatened by habitat loss.

References

pentoni
Amphibians described in 1893
Taxonomy articles created by Polbot